Beak & Claw is the debut EP by Sisyphus (released under the name S / S / S), a collaborative project between Serengeti, Sufjan Stevens, and Son Lux. It was released through Anticon on March 20, 2012. If featured guest appearances from Shara Worden and Doseone.

Critical reception

At Metacritic, which assigns a weighted average score out of 100 to reviews from mainstream critics, the EP received an average score of 64, based on 6 reviews, indicating "generally favorable reviews".

Austin Trunick of Under the Radar gave the album 3 out of 10 stars, saying, "Beak & Claw is largely a showcase for Serengeti's ambling, free-association raps, here set to glitchy electro pop, with mostly silly lyrics." He added: "Very little on Beak & Claw seems to fit together, and the artists are a weird match outside the alliteration of their names." Josh Becker of Beats Per Minute gave the EP a 62% rating, saying, "I understand that Beak & Claw is the maiden voyage of an experimental project, but its lack of cohesiveness comes off as a disappointment."

Track listing

Personnel
Credits adapted from liner notes.

S / S / S
 Serengeti – performance
 Sufjan Stevens – performance
 Son Lux – performance

Additional musicians
 Casey Foubert – bass guitar (1)
 James Mcalister – additional drums (1)
 Shara Worden – vocals (3)
 Doseone – vocals (4), additional programming (4)
 Hal Walker – jaw harp (4), harmonica (4)

Technical personnel
 Ryan Lott – mixing
 John McCaig – mastering

References

Further reading

External links
 

2012 debut EPs
Sisyphus (hip hop group) EPs
Anticon EPs
Albums produced by Sufjan Stevens